Franz Ströher (born 21 February 1854 in Oberwiesenthal; died 1936 in Germany) was a German hairdresser and businessman.

Life 
Franz Ströher worked as a hairdresser in Saxony. German Company Wella was founded in 1880 by him. The company Wella originally made tulles, the base used for making wigs. In 1890, Franz Ströher invented the Tullemoid Waterproof, a technique that allowed the scalp to breathe. In 1894, he opened his first factory in Rothenkirchen, Steinberg, Saxony. Franz Ströher was married and his sons Karl and George Ströher joined the business.

In 1924, the Ströhers registered the name Wella at the German patent office. As wigs and hairpieces fell out of fashion, the company turned to permanent wave products. In 1927, they introduced the first perming appliance and supplied it to salons.

References

External links 
 Spiegel.de: Die reichsten Deutschen: Mit Haartüll zum Marktführer (German)

German company founders
19th-century German businesspeople
20th-century German businesspeople
German hairdressers
1854 births
1936 deaths